William Riley Burnett (November 25, 1899  April 25, 1982) was an American novelist and screenwriter. He is best known for the crime novel Little Caesar, the  film adaptation of which is considered the first of the classic American gangster movies.

Early life
Burnett was born in Springfield, Ohio, and attented Miami Military Institute in Germantown, Ohio. He left his civil service job in Springfield to move to Chicago when he was 28, by which time he had written over 100 short stories and five novels, all unpublished.

Writing career
In Chicago, Burnett found a job as a night clerk in the seedy Northmere Hotel. He found himself associating with prize fighters, hoodlums, hustlers and hobos. They inspired Little Caesar (novel 1929, film 1931).  Little Caesar's overnight success landed him a job as a Hollywood screenwriter. Little Caesar became a classic movie, produced by First National Pictures (Warner Brothers) and starring little known Edward G. Robinson. The Al Capone theme was one he returned to in 1932 with Scarface. Burnett had won the 1930 O. Henry Award for his short story "Dressing-Up" published in Harper's Magazine in November 1929.

Burnett kept busy, producing a novel or more a year and turning most into screenplays (some as many as three times). Thematically Burnett was similar to Dashiell Hammett and James M. Cain but his contrasting of the corruption and corrosion of the city with the better life his characters yearned for, represented by the paradise of the pastoral, was fresh and original. He portrayed characters who, for one reason or another, fell into a life of crime. Once sucked into this life they were unable to climb out. They typically get one last shot at salvation but the oppressive system closes in and denies redemption.

Burnett's characters exist in a world of twilight morality — virtue can come from gangsters and criminals, malice from guardians and protectors. Above all his characters are human and this could be their undoing. In High Sierra (1941), Humphrey Bogart plays Roy Earle, a hard-bitten criminal who rejects his life of crime to help a sexually appealing crippled girl. In The Asphalt Jungle (1949), the most perfectly masterminded plot falls apart as each character reveals a weakness. In The Beast of the City (1932) starring Walter Huston, the police take the law into their own hands when the criminals walk free due to legal incompetence, foreshadowing Dirty Harry by almost 40 years.

Film work
Burnett worked with many of the greats in acting and directing, including Raoul Walsh, John Huston, John Ford, Howard Hawks, Nicholas Ray, Douglas Sirk, and Michael Cimino, John Wayne (The Dark Command), Humphrey Bogart, Ida Lupino, Paul Muni, Frank Sinatra, Marilyn Monroe, Steve McQueen and Clint Eastwood. He received an Oscar nomination for his script for Wake Island (1942) and a Writers Guild nomination for his script for The Great Escape. In addition to his film work he also wrote scripts for television and radio.

Later years
In later years, with his vision declining, he stopped writing and turned to promoting his earlier work. In his career he achieved huge popularity in Europe, where his anti-hero ideology was enthusiastically embraced.

On his death in 1982, in Santa Monica, California, Burnett was interred in the Forest Lawn Memorial Park Cemetery in Glendale, California.

Critical reception
Heywood Broun described Burnett's novel Goodbye to the Past as "written with all the excitement of Little Caesar, and ten times the skill".

Works

Novels

 Little Caesar (Lincoln MacVeagh/The Dial Press - 1929)
 Iron Man (Lincoln MacVeagh/The Dial Press - 1930)
 Saint Johnson (Lincoln MacVeagh/The Dial Press - 1930)
 The Silver Eagle (Lincoln MacVeagh/The Dial Press - 1931)
 The Beast of the City (Grosset & Dunlap - 1932) [not properly a Burnett novel; credit on the book reads "novelized by Jack Lait, from the screen story by W.R. Burnett"; the book was published concurrently with the release of the M-G-M film, circa March 1932]
 The Giant Swing (Harper - 1932)
 Dark Hazard (Harper - 1933)
 Goodbye to the Past: Scenes from the Life of William Meadows (Harper - 1934)
 The Goodhues of Sinking Creek (Harper - 1934)
 Dr. Socrates (O'Bryan House Publishing LLC - 2007) [Originally serialized in Colliers Weekly Magazine in 1935]
 King Cole (Harper - 1936)
 The Dark Command: A Kansas Iliad (Knopf - 1938)
 High Sierra (Knopf - 1941)
 The Quick Brown Fox (Knopf - 1943)
 Nobody Lives Forever (Knopf - 1943)
 Tomorrow's Another Day (Knopf - 1946)
 Romelle (Knopf - 1947)
 The Asphalt Jungle (Knopf - 1949)
 Stretch Dawson (Gold Medal - 1950). The film Yellow Sky (1948) was based on an early version of the novel.
 Little Men, Big World (Knopf - 1952)
 Adobe Walls: A Novel of the Last Apache Rising (Knopf - 1953)
 Vanity Row (Knopf - 1952)
 Big Stan (Gold Medal - 1953) - written under pseudonym "John Monahan"
 Captain Lightfoot (Knopf - 1954)
 It's Always Four O'Clock (Random House - 1956) - written under pseudonym "James Updyke"
 Pale Moon (Knopf - 1956)
 Underdog (Knopf - 1957)
 Bitter Ground (Knopf - 1958)
 Mi Amigo: A Novel of the Southwest (Knopf - 1959)
 Conant (Popular Library - 1961)
 Round the Clock at Volari's (Gold Medal - 1961)
 The Goldseekers (Doubleday - 1962)
 The Widow Barony (Macdonald - 1962)
 The Abilene Samson (Pocket Books - 1963)
 Sergeants 3 (Pocket Books - 1963)
 The Roar of the Crowd: Conversations with an Es-Big-Leaguer (C.N. Potter - 1964)
 The Winning of Mickey Free (Bantam Pathfinder - 1965)
 The Cool Man (Gold Medal - 1968)
 Good-bye, Chicago: 1928: End of an Era (St. Martin's - 1981)

Short stories
 Round Trip (1929)
 Dressing-Up (1930)
 Travelling Light (1935)
 Vanishing Act (1955)

Filmography
 
Little Caesar (1930) - script
The Finger Points (1931) - script
Iron Man (1931) - based on novel
Law and Order (1932) - based on novel Saint Johnson
Beast of the City (1932) - script
Scarface (1932) - script
Dark Hazard (1934) - based on novel
The Whole Town's Talking (1935) - script and based on short story "Jail Break"
Dr. Socrates (1935) - based on short story
36 Hours to Kill (1936) - based on short story "Across the Aisle"
Wine, Women and Horses (1937) - based on novel "Dark Hazard"
Wild West Days (1937) - from novel Saint Johnson
Some Blondes Are Dangerous (1937) - based on novel Iron Man
King of the Underworld (1939) - based on short story "Dr Socrates"
The Westerner (1940) - uncredited contribution
The Dark Command (1940) - from his novel
Law and Order (1940) - from his novel
High Sierra (1941) - novel, co-script
The Get-Away (1941) - script
Dance Hall (1941) - from his novel The Giant Swing
This Gun for Hire (1942) - script
Bullet Scars (1942) - uncredited remake of "Dr Socrates"
Wake Island (1942) - script
Crash Dive (1943) - story
Action in the North Atlantic (1943) - script
Background to Danger (1943) - script
San Antonio (1945) - story, script
Nobody Lives Forever (1946) - based on novel, script
The Man I Love (1946) - uncredited contribution to script
Belle Starr's Daughter (1948) - story, script
Yellow Sky (1948) - based on novel
Colorado Territory (1950) - uncredited remake of High Sierra
The Asphalt Jungle (1950) - based on novel, uncredited contribution
Iron Man (1951) - based on novel
The Racket (1951) - script
Vendetta (1951) - script
Law and Order (1953) - based on novel Saint Johnson
Arrowhead (1953) - based on novel
Dangerous Mission (1954) - script
Night People (1954) - uncredited contribution to script
Captain Lightfoot (1955) - based on novel, script
Illegal (1955) - script
I Died a Thousand Times (1956) - based on novel High Sierra, script
Accused of Murder (1957) - based on novel Vanity Row, script
Short Cut to Hell (1957) - remake of This Gun for Hire
The Badlanders (1958) - based on novel The Asphalt Jungle
The Hangman (1959) - uncredited contribution to script
September Storm (1960) - script
The Asphalt Jungle, television series, 13 episodes (1961) - scripts
The Lawbreakers (1961) - script
Sergeants Three (1962) - story, script
Cairo (1963) - from novel The Asphalt Jungle
The Great Escape (1963) - script
Four for Texas (1963) - uncredited contribution to script
The Jackals (1967) - remake of Yellow Sky
Ice Station Zebra (1968) - uncredited contribution to script
Stiletto (1969) - uncredited contribution to script
Cool Breeze (1972) - from novel The Asphalt Jungle

References

External links
 
 W.R. Burnett bibliography
 W.R. Burnett (bio), by John Strausbaugh, at The Chiseler
 W.R. Burnett at detnovel.com
 
 Portrait of W. R. Burnett, his first wife, Marjorie, and War Cry, the greyhound, Glendale, 1935. Los Angeles TimesPhotographic Archive (Collection 1429). UCLA Library Special Collections, Charles E. Young Research Library, University of California, Los Angeles.
 “'Pretty Big Once': W. R. Burnett’s Cynical Americana” by Cullen Gallagher, at the Los Angeles Review of Books

1899 births
1982 deaths
20th-century American novelists
American male screenwriters
American crime fiction writers
O. Henry Award winners
Edgar Award winners
Writers from Springfield, Ohio
Burials at Forest Lawn Memorial Park (Glendale)
Novelists from Ohio
American male novelists
American male short story writers
20th-century American short story writers
20th-century American male writers
Screenwriters from Ohio
20th-century American screenwriters